The COSAFA Women's Champions League is the brand name for an annual international women's association football club competition organized by the Council of Southern Africa Football Associations, serving as the Southern African qualification tournament for the CAF Women's Champions League.

History
With the imminent launch of the CAF Women's Champions League in October/November 2021, the member associations of COSAFA held a board meeting and decided to introduce a female club competition to represent their females team in the aforementioned competition.

Results

Top goalscorers

References

External links
 

CAF Women's Champions League
2021 in African football
2021 in women's association football